Taha Youssef El-Gamal (26 March 1923 – 1956) was an Egyptian swimmer. He competed in two events at the 1948 Summer Olympics and the water polo tournaments at the 1948 and 1952 Summer Olympics.

References

1923 births
1956 deaths
Egyptian male swimmers
Egyptian male water polo players
Olympic swimmers of Egypt
Olympic water polo players of Egypt
Swimmers at the 1948 Summer Olympics
Water polo players at the 1948 Summer Olympics
Water polo players at the 1952 Summer Olympics
Place of birth missing
Mediterranean Games bronze medalists for Egypt
Mediterranean Games silver medalists for Egypt
Mediterranean Games medalists in swimming
Mediterranean Games medalists in water polo
Competitors at the 1951 Mediterranean Games
Olympians killed in warfare
20th-century Egyptian people